Laos competed at the 2013 Southeast Asian Games. The 27th Southeast Asian Games took place in Naypyidaw, the capital of Myanmar, as well as in two other main cities, Yangon and Mandalay. Laos sent 334 athletes with 207 males and 127 females.

Medalist

References

Nations at the 2013 Southeast Asian Games
2013 in Laotian sport
2013